Astrid Rudebeck (1893–1982) was a Swedish court official. 

She served as överhovmästarinna (senior lady-in-waiting) at the Swedish Royal Court from 1956 to 1973.

References 

1893 births
1982 deaths
Mistresses of the Robes (Sweden)